The Warren Brick Streets of Warren, Arkansas are a collection of city streets that have retained original brick pavement laid down in the late 1920s. The bricks are laid out in a running bond pattern up to intersections, where a diamond pattern is used, partly to maintain the position of the bricks. The bricks measure 4 by 8.5 inches, and are probably 2 inches thick. It is surmised that the bricks were laid on a concrete substrate, in part because the condition of the surviving sections is very good.

The street sections were listed on the National Register of Historic Places in 2007.

See also
National Register of Historic Places listings in Bradley County, Arkansas

References

Roads on the National Register of Historic Places in Arkansas
Buildings and structures completed in 1927
National Register of Historic Places in Bradley County, Arkansas
Historic district contributing properties in Arkansas
Individually listed contributing properties to historic districts on the National Register in Arkansas
1927 establishments in Arkansas
Brick buildings and structures
Transportation in Bradley County, Arkansas
Brick Streets